Logan Ndenbe (born 9 February 2000) is a Belgian professional footballer who plays as a left-back for Major League Soccer side Sporting Kansas City.

Playing career
Ndenbe started is career at Mouscron. In 2017 he signed a deal with fellow Belgian club KV Oostende , he then made 3 appearances for the senior side before his departure for Guingamp.

On 14 January 2022, Ndenbe signed a 3-year deal with Major League Soccer club Sporting Kansas City.

International career
Born in Belgium, Ndenbe is of Cameroonian descent. He is a youth international for Belgium.

References

External links

Living people
2000 births
Belgian footballers
Belgium youth international footballers
Black Belgian sportspeople
Belgian people of Cameroonian descent
Association football defenders
K.V. Oostende players
Belgian Pro League players
Ligue 2 players
En Avant Guingamp players
Belgian expatriate footballers
Expatriate footballers in France
Sporting Kansas City players
Belgian expatriate sportspeople in the United States
Expatriate soccer players in the United States
Belgian expatriate sportspeople in France
Major League Soccer players
People from Mouscron
Footballers from Hainaut (province)